Moyaone Reserve Historic District is a national historic district located inclusive of the boundary of Piscataway Park, near Accokeek in Prince George's and Bryan's Road, Charles County, Maryland.  It encompasses 125 contributing buildings, 5 contributing site, and 3 contributing structures in a World War II-era subdivision.

References

External links 
 Moyaone Reserve @ Piscataway Park

See also  
 Accokeek Creek Site
 Charles M. Goodman
 Lenore Thomas Straus

Houses on the National Register of Historic Places in Maryland
Historic districts in Charles County, Maryland
Historic districts in Prince George's County, Maryland
Modern Movement architecture in the United States
Accokeek, Maryland
Houses in Charles County, Maryland
Houses in Prince George's County, Maryland
National Register of Historic Places in Charles County, Maryland
National Register of Historic Places in Prince George's County, Maryland
Historic districts on the National Register of Historic Places in Maryland